Colours FM is a Bangladeshi FM radio station, the headquarter of which radio is situated in Dhaka. It has started broadcasting on 10 January 2014. ColoursFM targets young women from the age range of 18–35 years. Their main purpose is to be a friend, guide, philosopher - that “person” you can come to when you need anything at all. Colours FM want to give their guidance to all the girls and women out there who need help not only with beauty, fashion, health, fitness, legal and finance but anything and everything you can name of. They want them to know what their rights are, at the same time they want to entertain them with the latest and old music. Everybody has their preference, but we want to make sure that we listen to what they have to say.

Show Names and Host

References

2014 establishments in Bangladesh
Organisations based in Dhaka
Radio stations in Bangladesh
Mass media in Dhaka